Advances in Space Research is a peer-reviewed scientific journal that is published 24 times per year  by Elsevier. It was established in 1981 and is the official journal of the Committee on Space Research (COSPAR). The editor-in-chief is Pascal Willis.

Topics of interest for this journal are all interactions observed in space research, including space studies of the Earth's surface, meteorology, and climate. Acceptable articles in the context of space research are from the perspective of astrophysics, materials science, the life sciences, and fundamental physics. Also included in this context is the study of planetary meteorologies, and planetary climates. Other research encompasses Earth-based astronomy observations, the study of space debris, and space weather.

Abstracting and indexing
The journal is abstracted and indexed in the following databases:
 Chemical Abstracts
 Current Contents/Physics
 Current Contents/Chemistry & Earth Science
 Geographical Abstracts
 Geological Abstracts
 Inspec
 Index to Scientific & Technical Proceedings
 Meteorological & Geoastrophysical Abstracts
 Science Citation Index
 Scopus
According to the Journal Citation Reports, Advance in Space Research has a 2020 impact factor of 2.152.

References

External links 
 

Space science journals
English-language journals
Elsevier academic journals
Semi-monthly journals
Publications established in 1981
Academic journals associated with international learned and professional societies
Aerospace engineering journals
Astronomy journals
Earth and atmospheric sciences journals